Badminton events at the 2014 Commonwealth Games took place between Thursday 24 July and Sunday 3 August at the newly built Emirates Arena, in Glasgow.

Badminton is one of ten core sports at the Commonwealth Games and has been continuously held at the Games since its first appearance at the 1966 British Empire and Commonwealth Games in Kingston, Jamaica. The badminton programme in 2014 included men's and women's singles competitions; men's, women's and mixed doubles competitions alongside a mixed team event throughout the 11 days of competition. The draw for the tournament was held on 21 July in Glasgow.

Schedule
All times are British Summer Time (UTC+1)

Medal table

Medal summary

References

External links
Glasgow 2014
Commonwealth Games Badminton 
Official results book – Badminton

 
2014
Badminton
Commonwealth Games
2014 Commonwealth Games